Edgardo Rivera (born 8 May 1953) is a Puerto Rican athlete. He competed in the men's pole vault at the 1984 Summer Olympics.

References

1953 births
Living people
Athletes (track and field) at the 1979 Pan American Games
Athletes (track and field) at the 1983 Pan American Games
Athletes (track and field) at the 1984 Summer Olympics
Puerto Rican male pole vaulters
Olympic track and field athletes of Puerto Rico
Place of birth missing (living people)
Central American and Caribbean Games medalists in athletics
Central American and Caribbean Games bronze medalists for Puerto Rico
Competitors at the 1974 Central American and Caribbean Games
Pan American Games competitors for Puerto Rico